Somoplatodes is a genus of beetles in the family Carabidae, containing the following species:

 Somoplatodes kuntzeni Basilewsky, 1986
 Somoplatodes multisetosus (Burgeon, 1936)

References

Lebiinae